Shenzhen Zhaowei, commonly known as ZW Drive, is a Shenzhen-based manufacturer of power transmission systems and gearboxes, including micro planetary gearboxes, precision reduction gear boxes, plastic and metal powder-based injection parts and its assemblies. The company also operates five fully-owned subsidiaries.

Company history 
The company was incorporated in 2001. It is active in power transmission, turbine, and engine industry. It reported a net profit of 244.7 million yuan in 2020. Zhaowei is listed on the Shenzhen Stock Exchange, completed its successful initial public offering (IPO) in December 2020.

Products 
 Brushed Gear Motor
 Brushless Gear Motor
 Stepper Gear Motor
 Coreless Gear Motor
 Planetary Gearbox
 Spur Gearbox
 Smart Home Drive
 Communication Drive
 Automotive Drive
 Intelligent Robot Drive
 Industrial Equipment Drive
 Medical Equipment Drive
 Consumer Electronics Drive
 Encoders
 Controls

Recognition 
 Baoan Great Craftsman Award (2020)
 Guangdong-Hong Kong-Macao Greater Bay Area Enterprise Innovation Ability List (2020)
 National Champion (2021)

See also
 List of companies listed on the Shenzhen Stock Exchange

References 

Chinese companies established in 2001
Companies listed on the Shenzhen Stock Exchange
Manufacturing companies based in Shenzhen